Blastobacter henricii is a bacterium from the genus of Blastobacter.

References

Nitrobacteraceae
Bacteria described in 1961